Marshall House, or variations such as Marshall Hall, may refer to:

in the United Kingdom
 Marshall House, Cambridge

in the United States

 Marshall House (Little Rock, Arkansas), listed on the National Register of Historic Places (NRHP)
 Couch-Marshall House, Magnolia, Arkansas, listed on the NRHP in Columbia County
 Sam Marshall House, Morning Star, Arkansas, listed on the NRHP in Searcy County
 Slack-Comstock-Marshall Farm, Uniontown, Arkansas, NRHP-listed
 John Marshall House Site, Old Shawneetown, Illinois, listed on the NRHP in Gallatin County
Thomas R. Marshall House, Columbia City, Indiana, NRHP-listed
 Marshall-Yohe House, Lincoln, Kansas, listed on the NRHP in Lincoln County, Kansas
 John Marshall Sr. House, Anchorage, Kentucky, listed on the NRHP in Anchorage, Kentucky
 Penn-Marshall Stone House, Harvieland, Kentucky, listed on the NRHP in Franklin County, Kentucky
 Marshall House (Junction City, Kentucky), listed on the NRHP in Boyle County, Kentucky
 Marshall-Bryan House, Nicholasville, Kentucky, listed on the NRHP in Jessamine County, Kentucky
 Marshall Hall, Maryland, Bryan's Road, Maryland, NRHP-listed
 Benjamin Marshall House, Dublin, New Hampshire, listed on the NRHP in Cheshire County
 Robert Marshall House, Blenheim, New Jersey, listed on the NRHP in Camden County
James W. Marshall House, Lambertville, New Jersey, NRHP-listed
 Marshall House (Canandaigua, New York), NRHP-listed
James G. Marshall House, Niagara Falls, New York, NRHP-listed
 Paul Marshall House, Plattsburgh, New York, NRHP-listed
 Marshall House (Schuylerville, New York), NRHP-listed
 Marshall-Harris-Richardson House, Raleigh, North Carolina, listed on the NRHP in Wake County
 David Marshall House, Dublin, Ohio, listed on the NRHP in Franklin County, Ohio
James E. Marshall House, Sandusky, Ohio, listed on the NRHP in Sandusky, Ohio
 Sprague-Marshall-Bowie House, Portland, Oregon, NRHP-listed
Thomas Marshall House (Dayton, Pennsylvania), NRHP-listed
 Humphry Marshall House, Marshallton, Pennsylvania, NRHP-listed
 Debruhl-Marshall House, Columbia, South Carolina, NRHP-listed
 Caleb H. Marshall House, St. Johnsbury, Vermont, listed on the NRHP in Caledonia County, Vermont
 Marshall House (Alexandria, Virginia), the site of the first significant battle death of the American Civil War
 Marshall-Rucker-Smith House, Charlottesville, Virginia, NRHP-listed
 General George C. Marshall's Dodona Manor, Leesburg, Virginia, NRHP-listed
 Ballard-Marshall House, Orange, Virginia, listed on the NRHP in Orange County
 John Marshall House, Richmond, Virginia, NRHP-listed
 Marshall House (New Cumberland, West Virginia), listed on the NRHP in West Virginia
 James Marshall House (Shepherdstown, West Virginia), NRHP-listed
 Marshall Memorial Hall, Lake Delton, Wisconsin, listed on the NRHP in Sauk County, Wisconsin
The Marshall House (Savannah, Georgia)

See also
James Marshall House (disambiguation)
Thomas Marshall House (disambiguation)
Marshall Houts (1919-1993), American attorney